Muribahal railway station is a railway station on the East Coast Railway network in the state of Odisha, India. It serves Muribahal village. Its code is MRBL. It has two platforms. Passenger, Express trains halt at Muribahal railway station.

Major trains

 Korba–Visakhapatnam Express
 Puri–Durg Express

See also
 Balangir district

References

Railway stations in Balangir district
Sambalpur railway division